The Group of Seven (G7) is an international forum consisting of the seven nations with the largest advanced economies – Canada, France, Germany, Italy, Japan, the United Kingdom, and the United States – and the European Union.

Group of Seven may also refer to:

Group of Eight, the name used by the G7 forum before the expulsion of Russia
Group of Seven (artists), a group of Canadian landscape painters 1920 to 1933, originally including Franklin Carmichael, Lawren Harris, A. Y. Jackson, Frank Johnston, Arthur Lismer, J. E. H. MacDonald, and Frederick Varley
 Group of Seven, or Metcalf Chateau, a group of American artists with ties to Honolulu, including Satoru Abe, Bumpei Akaji, Edmund Chung, Tetsuo Ochikubo, Jerry T. Okimoto, James Park, and Tadashi Sato 
 Group 7 element, a group of elements in the periodic table

See also
G7 (disambiguation)